Alubijid, officially the Municipality of Alubijid, is a 4th class municipality in the province of Misamis Oriental, Philippines. According to the 2020 census, it has a population of 32,163 people.

Etymology
The municipality name, "Alubijid", pronounced alubihid due to Spanish accent, is the local term for the hog plum tree.

History
Alubijid, along with El Salvador, was part of Cagayan de Misamis (present-day Cagayan de Oro) when the two entities petitioned to become municipalities in 1933. Alubijid became a separate town in 1940, and El Salvador became one 9 years later.

Geography

Barangays
Alubijid is politically subdivided into 16 barangays.

Climate

Demographics

Economy

Education

College:
University of Science and Technology of Southern Philippines (Main Campus)
Bukidnon State University - Alubijid Extension

High schools:
Alubijid National Comprehensive High School
Lourdes National High School
Living Hope Christian Academy (Private)

Elementary schools:
 Alubijid Central School
 Baybay Elementary School
 Benigwayan Elementary School
 Calatcat Elementary School
 Lagtang Elementary School
 Lanao Elementary School
 Loguilo Elementary School
 Lourdes Elementary School
 Lumbo Elementary School
 Molocboloc Elementary School
 Sampatulog Elementary School
 Sungay Elementary 
 Talaba Elementary School
 Taparak Elementary School
 Tugasnon Elementary School
 Tula Elementary School

References

External links
 [ Philippine Standard Geographic Code]
Philippine Census Information
Local Governance Performance Management System
 

Municipalities of Misamis Oriental